Qaleh Sangi or Qaleh-ye Sangi, also rendered as Qaleh Sang, may refer to:

Qaleh-ye Sangi, Chaharmahal and Bakhtiari
Qaleh Sangi, East Azerbaijan
Qaleh Sangi, Fars
Qaleh Sang, Darab, Fars Province
Qaleh Sangi, Isfahan
Qaleh Sangi, Lenjan, Isfahan Province
Qaleh Sangi, Lorestan
Qaleh-ye Sangi, Qom
Qaleh Sangi, Razavi Khorasan
Qaleh Sangi, Sarakhs, Razavi Khorasan Province
Qaleh Sangi-ye Rahmatabad, Razavi Khorasan Province
Qaleh Sangi, Tehran